Kenneth S. Warren (June 11, 1929 – September 18, 1996) was an American scientist, physician, educator and public health advocate.  He was an expert on tropical disease, in particular schistosomiasis.

Warren was born in Brooklyn, New York City in 1929 and earned his bachelor's degrees in history and literature at Harvard University in 1950 and his M.D. from Harvard Medical School in 1955.  Warren then went on to the National Institutes of Health as a researcher before completing postgraduate work at the London School of Hygiene & Tropical Medicine.  Warren taught on the faculty of Case Western Reserve University from 1963 to 1977 both in the school of medicine and in library science.  In 1977 he joined the Rockefeller Foundation as director of health services, where he worked for the next ten years.  His last years were spent first as the director of science at Maxwell Communications Corporation and then at Picower Institute for Medical Research until his death in 1996.

Warren traveled the globe studying and lending his expertise in an effort to strengthen and promote global health, focusing primarily on tropical medicine, the developing world, and the "Great Neglected Diseases of Mankind."  Throughout his career, Dr. Warren published some 200 scientific papers on the subject of tropical diseases such as schistosomiasis, malaria, and hookworm.

References

External links
 Articles by Kenneth S. Warren
 Kenneth S. Warren at Microsoft Encarta (Archived 2009-10-31)

1929 births
People from Brooklyn
Harvard Medical School alumni
American medical researchers
American parasitologists
1996 deaths
Deaths from cancer in New York (state)
American tropical physicians
Scientists from New York (state)
Members of the National Academy of Medicine